On 5 September 2020, was a rugby union match played between provinces on the North Island and the South Island of New Zealand. It was the eighty-first game between the islands and was the second one-off game after the fundraiser for the Otago Rugby Football Union in 2012 which the South won 32–24 at Forsyth Barr Stadium in Dunedin. The game along with Super Rugby Aotearoa supplants the 2020 Super Rugby season, which was suspended in March due to the COVID-19 pandemic.

The second one-off was first considered by new All Blacks head coach Ian Foster on 4 June. On 30 June was then confirmed to be played at Eden Park on 29 August. The teams were coached by assistant coaches John Plumtree and Scott McLeod for the North, and Greg Feek and Brad Mooar for the South.

On 21 August, the match was postponed to 5 September and was reschedule to be played at Sky Stadium when the country moved back to level 2 and Auckland moved back to level 3.

Squads

North

South

Match details

See also

North vs South rugby union match
Super Rugby Aotearoa

References

North vs South
Sports competitions in Wellington
Rugby union in the Wellington Region
North v South, 2020